Sainsbury's Active Kids was a voucher scheme run by Sainsbury's. Nurseries, schools, Scout and Guide groups and Clubmark-accredited sports club could redeem vouchers for sports & cooking equipment and active experiences such as dance, martial arts and keep fit.

Started in 2005, with the option of collecting vouchers for sports equipment, it expanded over the years to include cooking equipment. Sainsbury's donated over £185 million worth of equipment across the UK.

In 2011, Sainsbury's introduced ambassadors to its Active Kids campaign to help increase participation starting with David Beckham. In 2014, it was announced that from 2015 Beckham would be replaced by footballer Daniel Sturridge.

David Beckham 2011–2014
Ellie Simmonds 2011–2017
Jonnie Peacock 2011–2017 
Daniel Sturridge 2015–2017
Lucy Bronze 2015–2017
Jonnie Peacock and Ellie Simmonds 2018-2019

The scheme was run annually, usually between the end of January and the beginning of May.

The voucher scheme ended in 2018 and was replaced with the Active Kids Holiday Clubs, offering daily summer holiday childcare 70 locations across the UK.

The holiday clubs cost £7.50 per day and can be paid for using Nectar loyalty card points, money, or a combination of both.

See also
Sainsbury's

References

External links 

 Sainsbury's
 Active Kids website

Sainsbury's